Sir Richard Harry Evans (also known as Dick Evans),  (born 1942, Blackpool) is a British businessperson who is chairman of the Kazakh state holding company Samruk-Kazyna. He is formerly chairman of the British arms manufacturer BAE Systems.

In 2001 he became Chancellor of the University of Central Lancashire.  Evans was appointed a CBE in the 1986 Birthday Honours for services to export and was knighted in the 1996 Birthday Honours.

Career

Evans was educated at the Royal Masonic School in Bushey, Hertfordshire. In 1960, he joined the Ministry of Transport and Civil Aviation and was soon moved into the then newly formed Ministry of Technology.

In 1967, Evans was appointed as Government Contracts Officer at Ferranti in Manchester and two years later joined British Aircraft Corporation (BAC) at Warton, Lancashire.  

He was promoted to Commercial Director of what had then become the Warton Division of British Aerospace (BAe) in 1978.  Following BAe Aircraft Group managerial changes in January 1983, Evans was appointed Deputy Managing Director for BAe Warton and a member of the Aircraft Group Board. Evans was appointed Chief Executive of the Company in 1990. In June 1992 he was elected for a one-year term as President of the Society of British Aerospace Companies.

On 1 May 1998, Evans was appointed Chairman of British Aerospace plc.  In 1997 he joined the Board of United Utilities plc as a Non-Executive Director and was appointed Chairman on 1 January 2001. In 1998, he became a Non Executive Director of NatWest plc and resigned in February 2000. In 2001, Evans was installed as the second Chancellor of The University of Central Lancashire. He stepped down as Chairman of BAE Systems in 2004.

In October 2006, Evans was appointed as Chairman of The Board of Directors of State Holding Company Samruk, Kazakhstan. In October 2008 Evans was elected to the Board of Directors of "Samruk-Kazyna" as an independent director. In January 2014 he was again elected as an Independent Director of the Board of Directors of "Samruk-Kazyna" JSC.

Other interests
Evans has also been elected an Honorary Member of the NSPCC Council. During his chairmanship of BAE Systems he was the most senior supporter of the BAE Systems Charity Challenge, a body which co-ordinates and supports charitable activities of its employees. He is married with three daughters and is a keen golfer and classic car enthusiast.

See also
Al-Yamamah arms deal
Kazakhstan-United Kingdom relations

References

External links
 "Uni cements industrial links with installation of new Chancellor"
 Dick Evans profile: David Leigh and Rob Evans, Thursday 7 June 2007 Guardian Unlimited (accessed 4 December 2007)

1942 births
Fellows of the Royal Aeronautical Society
Knights Bachelor
Living people
People associated with the University of Central Lancashire
People from Blackpool
People educated at the Royal Masonic School for Boys
Businesspeople awarded knighthoods
Commanders of the Order of the British Empire
Deputy Lieutenants of Lancashire
National Society for the Prevention of Cruelty to Children people